Faithful in My Fashion is a 1946 American comedy film directed by Sidney Salkow and starring Donna Reed, Tom Drake and Edward Everett Horton.

Plot
Jeff (Tom Drake) arrives home to New York City after being away in the Army for several years. Unaware that his fiancée, Jean (Donna Reed), is now dating a man (Warner Anderson) at the department store where she works, Jeff assumes she is still intends to marry him. In order to save Jeff from heartache, several employees at Jean's store set up a ruse to keep Jeff unaware of Jean's new man until he is deployed again. Jean cooperates with the ruse, but it is not long before secrets are revealed.

Cast
 Donna Reed as Jean "Chunky" Kendrick
 Tom Drake as Jeff Compton
 Edward Everett Horton as Hiram Dilworthy
 Spring Byington as Miss Mary Swanson
 Harry Davenport as Great Grandpa
 Sig Ruman as Professor Boris Riminoffsky
 Margaret Hamilton as Miss Applegate
 Warner Anderson as 	Walter Medcraft
 Hobart Cavanaugh as Mr. Wilson
 Connie Gilchrist as Mrs. Murphy
 Fred Essler as Nikolai
 Wilson Wood as Henry Stute
 William 'Bill' Phillips as 1st Barfly
 Jack Overman as 	2nd Barfly
 Phyllis Kennedy as Miss Dale, Walter's Secretary 
 Barbara Billingsley as Mary 
 Lillian Yarbo as Celia

Reception
According to MGM records the movie was not a hit, earning $486,000 in the US and Canada and $140,000 elsewhere, making a loss to the studio of $307,000.

References

External links
 
 Faithful in My Fashion at TCMDB
 
 

1946 films
1946 romantic comedy films
Metro-Goldwyn-Mayer films
1940s English-language films
American romantic comedy films
Films scored by Nathaniel Shilkret
American black-and-white films
1940s American films
Films set in New York City